Grenko spoznanje is a novel by Slovenian author Darja Hočevar. It was first published in 2007.

See also
List of Slovenian novels

Slovenian novels
2007 novels